Kairouan was founded in about the year 670 when the Arab general Uqba ibn Nafi of Amir Muauia selected a site in the middle of a dense forest, then infested with wild beasts and reptiles, as the location of a military post for the conquest of the West. Today the city holds many significant mosques, as being one of the largest and richest cities of the maghreb for centuries, as well as the capital for many Arab Dynasties, such as the Fatimids, and the Hafsids.

Ummayaad
Great Mosque of Kairouan
Mosque al Hilali

Abbasid
Al-Zaytuna Mosque
Mosque of Sidi Sahab
Mosque Of Three Doors

Hafsid
Mosque Sidi Bouraoui
Mosque Negra

Ottoman
Mosque of the Sabres
Sidi Abid El Ghariani

unknown
Mosque el-Ghofran
Al-Huda Mosque
Asalam Mosque
Mosque Bémri
Mosque Maammar
Mosque Bilel
Atteban Mosque
Anas Bin Malek
Arrahman Mosque
Mosque AFH

Kairouan
Kairouan
Mosques